Koskela Light is a sector light tower located on the southern shore of Letonniemi promontory in Taskila district of the City of Oulu in Finland. The tower is located within the boundaries of the Letonniemi natural preserve.

History
It was built in 1940 to guide vessels towards the Toppila harbour.

The tower is -high octagonal concrete structure with an octagonal steel lantern, resting on a square slab of concrete. The tower was originally painted red with a white lantern. The light displayed a flash every three seconds, green, red or white depending on direction.

The light was noted as an active light in the 1996 List of Lights of Finland, but was not mentioned in the 2000 edition. The light was deactivated in the late 1990s and nautical charts dated in 2005 shows the light marked down as a cairn.

A footpath leading to the western end of the Letonniemi promontory leads next to the tower.

Gallery

References

Lighthouses completed in 1940
Gulf of Bothnia
Buildings and structures in Oulu
Lighthouses in Finland